Couric & Co. is the official blog of the CBS Evening News launched on September 5, 2006.  Overseen by anchor and managing editor Katie Couric, and written by her staff, the blog also features contributions from CBS writer/producer Greg Kandra and various CBS News correspondents and producers.  The blog provides insight into the planning of the daily broadcast, and features a daily summary of the stories on the night's broadcast by Katie Couric or the substitute anchor, under entries in its "First Look" category.

Couric & Co. differs from Public Eye, the blog of the overall CBS News division, which launched in September 2005.

See also
 The Daily Nightly, the NBC Nightly News blog

References

External links
Couric & Co.

CBS News
News blogs
American news websites
Internet properties established in 2006